Option Musique is the fourth radio station operated by RTS Radio Télévision Suisse. Now known as RTS Option Musique, the station was launched in 1994 and offers music programming along with popular French variety and contributes actively to the promotion of songwriters and performers in Switzerland. Every hour begins with a short news flash.

Reception
Option Musique can be received via FM in Geneva and Valais as well as DAB and DAB+, cable, satellite and via the Internet. Until 6 December 2010, it was also available on medium wave (765 kHz) through the Sottens transmitter.

See also 
 Radio suisse romande

External links 
 

Radio stations established in 1994
French-language radio stations in Switzerland
1994 establishments in Switzerland